Distinguisher may refer to:
Route distinguisher, an address qualifier used to distinguish Virtual Private Network (VPN) routes
Distinguishing attack, a cryptographic attack that distinguishes a ciphertext from truly random data